Zeynep is the Turkish form of the Arabic female given name Zaynab. Zeynep means "precious rock, precious gem" and may refer to:

People
Zeynep Ahunbay (born 1946), Turkish scholar of antiquities
Zeynep Sibel Algan (born 1955), Turkish diplomat
Zeynep Çelik-Butler, Turkish-American Professor of Electrical Engineering
Zeynep Ergun, Turkish academic
Zeynep Fadıllıoğlu, (born 1955), Turkish architect
Zeynep Karahan Uslu (born 1969), Turkish politician and public relations specialist
Zeynep Korkmaz (born 1922), Turkish scholar
Zeynep Sevde Paksu (born 1983), Turkish writer and publisher
Zeynep Tufekci, Turkish writer and academic

Arts and entertainment
Farah Zeynep Abdullah (born 1989), Iraqi-Turkish actress
Zeynep Değirmencioğlu (born 1954), Turkish actress
Zeynep Tokuş (born 1977), Turkish actress and beauty pageant winner
Zeynep Üçbaşaran, Turkish pianist

Sports
Zeynep Acet (born 1995); Turkish Paralympian sprinter
Zeynep Gamze Koçer (born 1998), Turkish footballer
Zeynep Kerimoğlu (born 2003), Turkish footballer
Zeynep Murat (born 1983), Turkish Taekwondo practitioner
Zeynep Sever (born 1989) Turkish-Belgian volleyball player
Viktoriya Zeynep Güneş (born 1998), Ukrainian-Turkish swimmer

Other uses
 , Liberia-flagged Turkish powership
 Zeynep Sultan Mosque, 1769-built mosque in Istanbul, Turkey for Ahmed III's daughter Zeynep Asıme Sultan
 Zeynep (storm), a 2022 cyclone over northwestern Europe

Turkish feminine given names